Nathaniel Porcalla (born June 26, 2003), known professionally as Nate Porcalla, is an American-born Filipino singer-songwriter, rapper and a member of the Filipino boy group BGYO. Porcalla has co-written several tracks released by BGYO: "The Light" (2021), "Runnin'" (2021) and "Rocketman" (2021).

Prior to his music career, Porcalla was a staple competitor and performer around the United States and have joined dance reality competitions in the Philippines: Dance Kids (2015) and World of Dance Philippines (2019).

Early life
Nathaniel Porcalla was born on the 26th of June 2003, in Chicago, Illinois, United States of America where he spent most of his childhood. He began showing his interest in dancing at the age of 6 and trained at Xtreme Dance Center in Naperville.

Career

2015–2018: Career Beginnings and Dance Kids 

In 2015, Porcalla went back and forth to Manila to compete with Dance Kids. On 22 April 2016, Porcalla, as a 7th grade student at Cowherd Middle School in Aurora, was selected and performed the dance routine of Justin Bieber's track "Children" as part of the Purpose World Tour. On 30 October 2016, he was able to perform Z and Fetty Wap's "Nobody's Better" on Darren Espanto's digital concert "The Other Side of DARREN".

2018–Present: Star Hunt Academy, World Of Dance PH and debut with BGYO 

Porcalla was part of the original trainees of the Star Hunt Academy program, along with Akira Morishita, in 2018 and became part of "SHA Boys". He and his four co-members were trained for two years under Filipino and South Korean mentors from MU Doctor Academy; vocal coach Kitchy Molina; and dance coach Mickey Perz. Porcalla discovered his rapping skills inside the camp. They were officially announced in the pre-show of PBB Otso Big Night as Star Hunt trainees on 3 August 2019 and debuted as a member of BGYO on 29 January 2021.

Artistry
Porcalla have cited BTS, Exo, GOT7, Wanna One, Seventeen, NCT, WayV, Stray Kids, TXT, Treasure, and Big Bang as musical inspirations. In an interview with Myx Global, Porcalla have also cited Jabbawockeez as an influence, saying "the Jabbawockeez inspired me to get into music, and would even copy how they would dance".

Impact and influence
Porcalla was the youngest member of BGYO and was considered as one of the seasoned dancers of the group that made him called as the "Dance Machine" on stage.

Personal life
Porcalla's mom greatly influenced him on his interest in music and as an idol. He was used to being a fan of fashion brands and hypes like Rick Owens, Playboi Carti and Jordans.

Discography

Production credits 
All song credits are adapted from the Tidal, unless otherwise noted.

Concerts

Special performances

Filmography

Series

Television

Webcast

Notes

References

External links

 

BGYO
Members of BGYO
Living people
2003 births
American people of Filipino descent
Star Music artists
ABS-CBN personalities
American male models
21st-century Filipino male singers
People from Chicago
Musicians from Chicago